The women's middleweight (73 kilograms) event at the 2014 Asian Games took place on 3 October 2014 at Ganghwa Dolmens Gymnasium, Incheon, South Korea.

A total of eleven competitors from eleven different countries competed in this event, limited to fighters whose body weight was less than 73 kilograms.

Sorn Seavmey of Cambodia won the gold medal after beating Fatemeh Rouhani of Iran in gold medal match 7–4, The bronze medal was shared by Abrar Al-Fahad of Kuwait and Kirstie Alora from the Philippines.

Sorn Seavmey made history for her country and won Cambodia's first ever gold medal in its 60-year history of participation at the Asian Games.

Schedule
All times are Korea Standard Time (UTC+09:00)

Results

References

External links
Official website

Taekwondo at the 2014 Asian Games